MAAK-Conservative Party was a political party in Macedonia. The party was led by Strašo Angelovski. The party claimed to be the legal inheritor of the Movement for All-Macedonian Action (MAAK).

Although the party participated in all election cycles from the introduction of the multi-party system in the Republic of Macedonia until the Parliamentary elections in 2002 , it never managed to win a seat and enter the Parliament of the Republic of Macedonia. After the military conflict in the Republic of Macedonia in 2001 , at a meeting of the leadership, the party changed its name from MAAK - Conservative Party to MAAK - United Macedonian Option (MAAK - EMO). The party ceased its political activity after the 2002 elections, when the leadership changed Strasho Angelovski from the party's presidency and decided to join the party completely to VMRO-DPMNE..

Prior to the 2016 parliamentary elections, the party renewed its platform and joined a VMRO-DPMNE-led coalition called Macedonian Action

References

Conservative parties in North Macedonia
Eastern Orthodox political parties